Women's Christian College may refer to:

 Women's Christian College, Ernakulam, Tamil Nadu, India
 Women's Christian College, Calcutta, West Bengal, India
 Women's Christian College, Chennai
 Women's Christian College, Nagercoil